Villanova sull'Arda (or ) is a comune (municipality) in the Province of Piacenza in the Italian region Emilia-Romagna, located about  northwest of Bologna and about  east of Piacenza.  

The commune borders on the municipalities of Besenzone, Busseto, Castelvetro Piacentino, Cortemaggiore, Monticelli d'Ongina, Polesine Zibello, San Pietro in Cerro, Stagno Lombardo.

Main sights
 The  Giarola River Park Island  is located in the local part of the flood plain of the River Po. It is an example of environmental restoration after the intense mining of sand.

People
Sant'Agata was the home for over 50 years of the opera composer Giuseppe Verdi who was born in the village of Le Roncole in 1813, who lived in the nearby town of Busseto, and who bought the land and built the Villa Verdi in 1848

Culture

Festivals in the town include  the "Cherry Festival", held in the second week of June, and the "Festival of the Frog and Catfish", which  takes place on the last Sunday of May in the village of Soarza.

Sport
Villanova is home to a basketball team  (Villanova Basketball Pro), participating in the First Division  of FIP.

Transportation 
Villanova sull'Arda has a railway station on the Cremona–Fidenza line.  Direct connections are available from Cremona, while some trains run directly from Parma to both Busseto and Villanova sull'Arda without changing.

References

External links
 Villa Verdi official website  

Cities and towns in Emilia-Romagna